Hans Brenner (9 August 1938 – 4 September 1998) was an Austrian actor. He appeared in more than eighty films from 1953 to 1998. He was the father of actor Moritz Bleibtreu.

Selected filmography

References

External links 

1938 births
1998 deaths
Austrian male film actors
Austrian male television actors
20th-century Austrian male actors